Sarah McKenzie is an Australian jazz musician. She is a singer, pianist, composer, and arranger. Her album Close Your Eyes won the 2012 ARIA Music Award for Best Jazz Album. She was also nominated for the same award in 2011 with Don't Tempt Me and in 2015 for We Could Be Lovers. We Could Be Lovers won an Australian Jazz Bell Award in 2015 for Best Australian Jazz Vocal Album.

Discography

Albums

Awards

ARIA Music Awards
The ARIA Music Awards is an annual awards ceremony that recognises excellence, innovation, and achievement across all genres of the music of Australia.

! 
|-
| 2011
|Don't Tempt Me
| Best Jazz Album
| 
| 
|-
| rowspan="2"| 2012
|Close Your Eyes 
| Best Jazz Album
| 
| 
|-
| Chong Lim for Close Your Eyes
| ARIA Award for Producer of the Year
| 
|-
| 2015
|We Could Be Lovers 
| Best Jazz Album
| 
| 
|-

Jazz Bell Awards
The Australian Jazz Bell Awards are annual music awards for the jazz music genre in Australia.

|-
| 2015
| We Could Be Lovers 
| Best Australian Jazz Vocal Album
| 
|-

References

External links
Sarah McKenzie

Living people
ARIA Award winners
Australian women musicians
Year of birth missing (living people)